Gamma Aquilae, Latinized from γ Aquilae, and formally known as Tarazed , is a star in the constellation of Aquila. It has an apparent visual magnitude of 2.712, making it readily visible to the naked eye at night.

Properties

Gamma Aquilae is a relatively young star with an age of about 270 million years. Nevertheless, it has reached a stage of its evolution where it has consumed the hydrogen at its core and expanded into what is termed a bright giant star, with a stellar classification of K3 II. The star is now burning helium into carbon in its core. After it has finished generating energy through nuclear fusion, Gamma Aquilae will become a white dwarf.

The star has an estimated 3.5 times the mass of the Sun and has expanded to 92 times the Sun's radius. It is radiating over  times the luminosity of the Sun. A 1991 catalogue of photometry reported that Gamma Aquilae showed some variation in its brightness, but this has not been confirmed.

Nomenclature
γ Aquilae (Latinised to Gamma Aquilae) is the star's Bayer designation.

It bore the traditional name Tarazed, which may derive from the Persian شاهين ترازو šāhin tarāzu "the beam of the scale", referring to an asterism of the Scale, Alpha, Beta and Gamma Aquilae. (Persian šāhīn means "royal falcon", "beam", and "pointer", and gave its name (as "falcon") to Beta Aquilae.) In 2016, the International Astronomical Union organized a Working Group on Star Names (WGSN) to catalogue and standardize proper names for stars. The WGSN approved the name Tarazed for this star on 21 August 2016 and it is now so entered in the IAU Catalog of Star Names.
 
In the catalogue of stars in the Calendarium of Al Achsasi Al Mouakket, this star was designated Menkib al Nesr (منكب ألنسر - mankib al-nasr), which was translated into Latin as Humerus Vulturis, meaning 'the eagle's shoulder'.

In the Chinese folk tale The Cowherd and the Weaver Girl, Gamma Aquilae and Beta Aquilae are the children of Niulang (牛郎, The Cowherd, Altair) and Zhinü (織女, The Princess, Vega).

The Koori people of Victoria knew Beta and Gamma Aquilae as the black swan wives of Bunjil'' (Altair), the wedge-tailed eagle.

References

External links
 Tarazed
 Tarazed
 HR 7525
 Image Gamma Aquilae

K-type bright giants
Suspected variables

Aquila (constellation)
Aquilae, Gamma
Durchmusterung objects
Aquilae, 50
186791
097278
7525
Tarazed